Pula is a surname. Notable people with the surname include:

 Gazmend Pula, Kosovar-Albanian intellectual, human rights campaigner, and is Kosovar ambassador to Albania
 James S. Pula (born 1946), award-winning Polish-American historian, professor, author, and Polonia activist
 Robert P. Pula (1929–2004), Director Emeritus of the Institute of General Semantics, author, and composer

See also 

 Pula (disambiguation)

surnames